"Stem", also known by its Japanese translated title  is a song written by Japanese singer Ringo Sheena and released in several versions.

Background 

The single version is sung in English, and was orchestrated by Toshiyuki Mori. The B-sides "Meisai" and "Ishiki" were arranged by Bakeneko Killer, a production team Sheena and Inoue formed. Nobuyoshi Araki, the prominent photographer, took the album cover.

The version featured on the album Kalk Samen Kuri no Hana, is sung in Japanese and arranged by Bakeneko Killer. A further version found on the vinyl edition of Kalk Samen Kuri no Hana called , featured the album arrangement with English lyrics. It was also featured on the film Cassherns official album Our Last Day: Casshern Official Album. An English language version of "Stem" also appears on Sheena's 2007 soundtrack Heisei Fūzoku, orchestrated by Neko Saito.

The song was used as the theme song for Sheena's short film , released in January 2003. It was also the theme song for the stage play Lens that was based on the film, which was held at the Sunshine Theater from July 5 to July 11 at Tokyo, and at the Theater Drama City from July 24 to July 25 in Osaka.

Track listing

 Personnel 
M2 / : orchestra
 Conductor: Goto Yuichiro

M1, 3 / : rock band
 Vocals, Percussion: Ringo Sheena 
 Electric guitars (Fender Telecaster): Ryosuke Nagaoka (Ukigumo)
 Drums: Ahito Inazawa (from Vola and the Oriental Machine, ex-Number Girl) 
 Electric bass guitars, Contrabass: Hitoshi Watanabe 
 Shinobue: Hideyo Takakuwa
 Violin: Neko Saito 
 Didgeridoo: Tab Zombie (from Soil & "Pimp" Sessions)

 Music video cast Kuki (STEM) Actress - Kaede Katsuragi: Koyuki (actress)
 Student aspiring novelist - Amagi: Kentaro Kobayashi (actor)
 Detective - Komagata: Nao Omori (actor)
 A woman: Ringo SheenaMeisai'
 Maid & singer: Ringo Sheena 
 Student: Kazuki Yamaguchi (Toshiba-EMI director)
 Aristocrat: Ryosuke Nagaoka
 Aristocrat: Ahito Inazawa
 Aristocrat: Neko Saito
 Aristocrat: Hitoshi Watanabe
 Aristocrat: Atsuhide Tsukuda (music planning company BEA)
 Fake Ringo Sheena: Keiko Yokomachi (actress)

Notes 

Ringo Sheena songs
2003 singles
2003 songs
Japanese film songs
Songs written by Ringo Sheena
English-language Japanese songs
Japanese-language songs